Anything may refer to:

Albums
 Anything (The Cranberry Saw Us demo), by the band later named the Cranberries, 1990
 Anything (The Damned album) or the title song (see below), 1986
 Anything (Kinnie Starr album) or the title song, 2006
 Anything (Martina Topley-Bird album), the US version of Quixotic, or the title song, 2003

Songs
 "Anything" (3T song), 1995
 "Anything" (The Calling song), 2004
 "Anything" (Culture Beat song), 1993
 "Anything" (Damage song), 1996
 "Anything" (The Damned song), 1986
 "Anything" (Edyta Górniak song), 1998
 "Anything" (Eric Burdon and the Animals song), 1967
 "Anything" (Hedley song), 2013
 "Anything" (Jay-Z song), 2000 (for the 2006 song, see below)
 "Anything" (JoJo song), 2007
 "Anything" (SWV song), 1994
 "Anything (To Find You)", by Monica, 2011
 "Anything, Anything (I'll Give You)", by Dramarama, 1985
 "Anything", by An Endless Sporadic playable in Guitar Hero: World Tour and Guitar Hero 5, 2008
 "Anything", by Jaheim from Ghetto Love, 2001
 "Anything", by Jay-Z from Kingdom Come, 2006
 "Anything", by Keke Wyatt from Rated Love, 2016
 "Anything", by Man Overboard from Heavy Love, 2015
 "Anything", by the Mothers of Invention from Cruising with Ruben & the Jets, 1968
 "Anything", by Plain White T's from All That We Needed, 2005
 "Anything", by Savage from Moonshine, 2005
 "Anything", by SZA from Ctrl, 2017
 "Anything", by Third Eye Blind from Blue, 1999
 "Anything", by Tim Skold from Skold, 1996

Other uses
 Anything (film), a 2017 American film directed by Timothy McNeil
 anything, an English indefinite pronoun

See also
 N.E. Thing Co., a Canadian art collective 1967–1978
 Top type, in type theory and computer programming, the type of which every possible data object is an example
 Something (disambiguation)
 Nothing (disambiguation)
 Everything (disambiguation)